CFBDSIR 2149-0403 (full designation CFBDSIR J214947.2-040308.9) is a free-floating planetary-mass object or possibly a high-metallicity, low-mass brown dwarf in the constellation Aquarius. Originally, it was thought to be part of the AB Doradus moving group (ABDMG) as indicated by its position and proper motion, but the same team that discovered the object and conjectured its membership in the group has now rejected that hypothesis due to newer measurements. Without that membership, the age and mass of the object cannot be constrained. There is insufficient evidence to demonstrate that CFBDSIR 2149-0403 formed as a planet and was subsequently ejected.

Discovery 
CFBDSIR 2149-0403 was discovered by the Canada-France Brown Dwarfs Survey, a near-infrared sky survey, and confirmed by WISE data.
Philippe Delorme, of the Institute of Planetology and Astrophysics of Grenoble in France and his team, including researchers at Université de Montréal in Canada, detected CFBDSIR2149's infrared signature using the Canada-France-Hawaii Telescope. They then examined the body's properties with the European Southern Observatory's Very Large Telescope in Chile.

Distance 
If this object is actually a rogue planet (which has not been decisively demonstrated), then it is among the closest that has ever been spotted. If the object belongs to the ABDMG then its distance is estimated to be 40±4 parsecs (130±13 light-years) from Earth; other possible estimates range from 25 to 50 parsecs. The closest confirmed rogue planet is PSO J318.5-22.

Age 
In the discovery paper, CFBDSIR 2149-0403 was claimed to possibly be a kinematic member of the AB Doradus moving group (ABDMG). The ABDMG appears to be similar in age to the Pleiades, which has a lithium-depletion boundary age of  Myr. If CFBDSIR2149 is indeed associated with the ABDMG, then it is similarly young. However, with Delorme's team now rejecting that hypothesis, estimates are either under 500 million years as a rogue planet with mass between 2 and 13 Jupiter masses, or else a two- to three-billion-year-old brown dwarf with mass between 2 and 40 Jupiter masses. The object shows signs of low gravity (brighter K band in the near-infrared), which could be attributable to youth.

Atmosphere 

Spectroscopy observations have found light absorption by gaseous methane and water in the object's atmosphere.

See also

 GU Piscium b, an exoplanet orbiting GU Piscium at a distance of 2000 AU and period of 163,000 years in the AB Doradus moving group
 2MASS J1119–1137, a similar rogue exoplanet discovered in 2016

Further reading

References 

Free-floating substellar objects
Giant planets
CFBDS objects
20121114
Rogue planets
Articles containing video clips